Gangsta Blues is the fifth studio album by Jamaican recording artist Tanya Stephens. This album was probably the most politically driven album with tracks like "What a Day", "The Other Cheek" and "Sound of My Tears". The album also has a lovers rock feel to it (as is common in Tanya's albums) with songs such as "Good Ride" and "It's a Pity" (with the latter giving her international success).

Background
Recording for the album took place in-between 2001 and 2004. It was recorded across various recording studios in Jamaica and America. Production came from her longtime life partner Andrew Henton among many others including Neil Amos, Romain "Sherkhan" Chiffre, Mr. Doo, Philip "Fatis" Burrell, Steven Stanley, and Digital B, with writing coming from Tanya herself on every track, Andrew on most plus a lot of other writers throughout the album.
The general topics covered on Gangsta Blues range from government, the current quality of modern music, love & politics.

Track listing

Reception
Kelefa Sanneh of The New York Times described the music as "acoustic-guitar laments and joyful digital dancehall", and in Sanneh's view the album is "full of witty reggae protest songs". Vibes Rob Kenner regarded it as Stephens' best album to date. Allmusic writer Rick Anderson gave it two and half stars out of five, describing the rhythms as "expert but not exactly revelatory ", and the lyrics "mostly a predictable mix of defensive braggadocio and by-the-numbers slackness", but picking out "Little White Lie", "What's Your Story", and "It's a Pity" for particular praise.

Chart History

Billboard
Billboard Reggae albums - 10

Personnel
Writers - V. Stephenson, C. Grant, W. Jean, A. Henton, C. Lawrence, R. Myrie, P Baigorry, J. Buggon, L. Topp, C. Dodd, H. Reddy, R. Burton, E. Getthard, H. Seaton
Producers - Dave Kelly, Tony Kelly, Andrew Henton, Barry O'Hare, Neil Amos,  Romain "Sherkhan" Chiffre, Tanya Stephens, Mr. Doo, Phillip 'Fattis' Burrell, Louis "Flabba" Malcolm, Anthony Senior, Boris Silvera, Steven Stanley, Digiteal B
Editing & Mixing - Paul Shields of VP Records
Cover Art photography - William Richards
Cover Art design - Kerry DeBruce
Publishing - VP Records, Tarantula Records, Warner/Chappell, STB Music, Topp Entertainment, Jamrec Music

Please note
Information such as Writers & Personnel is taken directly from the CD inlay.

References

2004 albums
Tanya Stephens albums